Orda may refer to:
Orda (organization), a historical sociopolitical and military structure of Mongol Eurasia
Orda Khan, a 13th-century Mongol Khan
Orda (rural locality), several rural localities in Russia
Olympic Regional Development Authority (ORDA), a public benefit corporation in New York, United States
Orda, Hungarian name of urdă, a whey cheese